Ahmadabad (also Romanized as Aḩmadābād; also known as Aḩmadābād-e Mavālī) is a village in Hoveyzeh Rural District, in the Central District of Hoveyzeh County, Khuzestan Province, Iran. At the 2006 census, its population was 554, in 77 families.

References 

Populated places in Hoveyzeh County